Simi Valley High School (SVHS) is a public high school in Simi Valley, California. The school is part of the Simi Valley Unified School District and is located on the east side of the city.

History
Simi Valley High School was established in 1920 as the first high school in Simi Valley.

The campus has undergone several configurations over the years to become the  campus it is today. The current campus was built in three phases during the 1960s. Based on the physical concept of "schools-within-a-school," Simi Valley High School was constructed with three instructional quads, each having an administrative area. The original design also included one main administration building. Currently, the school is configured with five major instructional areas, a multipurpose building, a gym and dressing room facilities, a library, a counseling facility, an administration building, a new area of portable classrooms, a stadium and athletic fields, a new senior patio, and a band room with all different types of instruments.

Demographics
The demographic breakdown by race/ethnicity of the 2,107 students enrolled for the 2019–2020 school year was:

Academics
In the annual public high school rankings from U.S. News & World Report, Simi Valley High School was ranked in 2021 as the 17th best high school in the Oxnard-Ventura metropolitan area, with an overall score of 67.65 out of 100. That makes it the 3rd best high school in the Simi Valley Unified School District, behind Santa Susana High School and Royal High School.

Athletics
Simi Valley High School's athletic teams are nicknamed the Pioneers, and the school's mascot is Herman, or Hermie, the Pioneer, established around 1940. The school's colors are maroon and gold; originally, the colors were purple and silver but these were changed in the mid-1920s. The school is a charter member of the Coastal Canyon League (CCL), a conference within the CIF Southern Section (CIF-SS) that was established in 2014. SVHS competes in the CCL for all sports except football and in the Marmonte Football Association for football. Prior to 2014, the school was a long-time member of the Marmonte League. Simi Valley's primary rival is Royal High School on the west side of the city.

Notable alumni

Acting
 Shailene Woodley, actress, The Secret Life of the American Teenager, The Descendants, The Fault in Our Stars, Divergent

Music
 Rick Coonce, drummer, The Grass Roots
Scott Radinsky, singer, Ten Foot Pole and Pulley; drummer, Scared Straight.

Politics
 Cara Hunter, Northern Irish politician

Sports
 Bryan Anderson, Major League Baseball player in the St. Louis Cardinals organization
 Tom Herman, head football coach, Florida Atlantic University
 Tim Laker, former Major League Baseball player
 Don MacLean, all-time UCLA Bruins men's basketball scoring leader and NBA player
 Ben Orloff, Minor League Baseball player
 Scott Radinsky, coach for Los Angeles Angels, former Major League Baseball pitcher for Chicago White Sox
 Beau Sandland, NFL tight end
 Bob Skube, retired Major League Baseball player
 Jeff Weaver, Major League Baseball pitcher for Los Angeles Dodgers
 Jered Weaver, Major League Baseball pitcher for Los Angeles Angels

Writing
 David Farley, food and travel writer

References

External links
 
 Simi Valley Unified School District

Education in Simi Valley, California
High schools in Ventura County, California
Simi Valley Unified School District schools
Public high schools in California
1920 establishments in California
Educational institutions established in 1920